Net worth is the total assets minus total outside liabilities of an individual or a company.

Net Worth may also refer to:
 Net Worth (1995 film), a Canadian television film about Ted Lindsay's fight for hockey player's rights
 Net Worth (2000 film), an American drama film
 "Net Worth" (Sliders), a television series episode